Zhu Zhen (5 April 1364 – 22 March 1424), the Prince of Chu (楚昭王), was a prince of the Ming dynasty. He was the sixth son of the Hongwu Emperor.

Family 
Consorts and Issue:
 Princess consort of Chu, of the Wang clan (楚王妃 王氏; 1363–1397), daughter of Wang Bi, Marquess of Dingyuan (定遠侯 王弼)
 Zhu Mengwan, Prince Zhuang of Chu (楚莊王 朱孟烷; 1382–1439), third son
 Lady, of the Pan clan (潘氏)
 Zhu Mengwei, Prince Jingjian of Chongyang (崇陽靖簡王 朱孟煒; 10 April 1387 – 1448), fifth son
 Lady, of the Li clan (李氏)
 Zhu Mengyue, Prince Jinggong of Tongshan (通山靖恭王 朱孟爚; 12 February 1388 – 1444), sixth son
 Lady, of the Hua clan (華氏)
 Zhu Mengcan, Prince Zhuangjin of Tongcheng (通城莊靖王 朱孟燦; 6 October 1389 – 1455), seventh son
 Unknown
 Zhu Mengcong, Prince Daojian of Bailing (巴陵悼簡王 朱孟熜; 23 May 1381 – 14 April 1397), first son
 Zhu Mengjiong, Prince Yijiang of Yong'an (永安懿簡王 朱孟炯; 12 May 1382 – 1432), second son
 Zhu Mengchao, Prince Anxi of Shouchang (壽昌安僖王 朱孟焯; 1383–1440), fourth son
 Zhu Mengzhao, Prince Shunjing of Jingling (景陵順靖王 朱孟炤; 16 February 1393 – 8 January 1447), eighth son
 Zhu Mengguang, Prince Daohui of Yueyang (岳陽悼惠王 朱孟爟; 15 March 1394 – 1426), ninth son
 Zhu Mengju, Prince Kangjing of Jingxia (江夏康靖王 朱孟炬; 1412–1474), tenth son
 Princess Huarong (華容郡主), first daughter
Married Ma Zhu (馬注)
 Princess Yuanjing (沅江郡主), second daughter
 Princess Linxiang (臨湘郡主), third daughter
 Princess Qingxiang (清湘郡主), fourth daughter
Married Geng Xiu (耿琇)
 Princess Yunmeng (雲夢郡主), fifth daughter
 Princess Anxiang (安鄉郡主), sixth daughter
Married Wei Ning (魏寧)
 Princess Liyang (澧陽郡主), seventh daughter
Married Zhang Jian (張鑑)
 Princess Xingning (興寧郡主), eight daughter
Married Ge Long (葛隆)
 Princess Qiyang (祁陽郡主), ninth daughter
Married Li Cheng (李澄)

Tomb

Ancestry

References

Further reading

 

1364 births
1424 deaths
Ming dynasty imperial princes
Sons of emperors